Joseph Curran (1906–1981), American trade unionist.

Joseph Curran may also refer to:
Joseph Curran (basketball) (1922–2012), American basketball player
J. Joseph Curran Jr. (born 1931), American politician in Maryland

See also

Joe Curran (disambiguation)